Cerviño is a surname originally from the province of Pontevedra, in the autonomous community of Galicia in northwestern Spain. In Galician, the native language of the region, it means "little deer", the -iño ending being very characteristic of this romance language.

Origins of the surname
The surname Cerviño derives directly from the Latin cervus and has also derived into Cervinho in Portuguese. Most branches of the Cerviño family originated in the province of Pontevedra and from there extended itself to other parts of Spain (like Ourense, A Coruña and parts of Andalusia) and several other countries, among which Uruguay, Cuba and Argentina can be accounted for. Nevertheless, the surname is still more common in Pontevedra, and more particularly in the area of Cotobade.

Notable members of the family
Though no single family tree has been established yet, it is perfectly possible that almost all Cerviños are blood-related (since most come from the same area). Several famous people can claim kinship with this clan. Among them are:

Pedro Antonio Cerviño Núñez de la Fuente (1757–1816), Galician navigator, engineer and topographer who sailed towards Argentina during the colonial era, when he was 25 years old. He sailed up the Uruguay River and reached Rio de la Plata in the 1780s. He chartered a map of Buenos Aires in 1801 while he worked as a journalist and scientist. His home was a major centre of reunion for the cultured and talented of Buenos Aires, and he entertained guests of different cultural and social backgrounds. However, in 1806 he fell out of favour following a speech he gave on the Minister of the Indies, and he consequently lost his job. Nevertheless, repeated invasions carried out by the English earned him back the reputation he had lost and he actively participated in political matters for a time. His remains are buried in the Convent of Saint Francis. His ancestry can be traced at least four more generations. In 1802 he married a noblewoman of  Cantabrian extraction and a sister of a colleague, María Bárbara Barquín Velasco y Lavín Tagle Bracho (b. 1774), who turned out to be a great support for her husband and a talented writer.
José Cerviño García (1843–1922) was a Galician sculptor whose greatest work is the well known Cruceiro de Hio, in the province of Pontevedra (Spain. The son of Manuel Cerviño (bastard son of Teresa Cerviño Dogando) and of Rosalía García Suárez (1817–1882), he belonged to an impoverished family of sculptors and agricultural labourers. From a very early age he took an interest in sculpture and modeled his magnificent Cruceiro before he was 30 (1873). This earned him sufficient merit to create similar cruceiros throughout the region, though none s as magnificent as the aforementioned opus. He also built mausoleums and churches for the local people who knew him as "Pepe da Pena" on account of his birthplace, A Pena (municipality of Cotobade). He married twice. His first wife, Telesfora pena Barreira (1840–1889) died leaving him with five children. His next marriage was to a woman of higher birth, María Manuela Montero Duro, a relative of the Spanish Prime Minister Eugenio Montero Ríos. He is the grandfather of the former president of the Royal Spanish Olympic Archery Federation (Real Federación Española de Tiro Olímpico), Manuel Rivas Cerviño. Cerviño García died in poverty and blind in 1922.

External links
 Galicia Espallada: El Tercio de Gallegos 
 As Voltas cos Mausoleos Asinados por Xosé Cerviño García, by Estanislao Fernández de la Cigoña 

Surnames